Kis-Küküllő was an administrative county (comitatus) of the Kingdom of Hungary. Its territory is now in central Romania (central Transylvania). Kis-Küküllő is the Hungarian name for the river Târnava Mică. The capital of the county was Dicsőszentmárton (now Târnăveni).

Geography

Kis-Küküllő county shared borders with the Hungarian counties Alsó-Fehér, Torda-Aranyos, Maros-Torda, Udvarhely and Nagy-Küküllő. The river Mureș formed part of its northern border, the river Târnava Mare its southern border. Târnava Mică river flowed through the county. Its area was 1,724 km² around 1910.

History
Kis-Küküllő county came into existence in 1876, when the administrative structure of Transylvania was changed and Küküllő County was split. In 1920, by the Treaty of Trianon, the county became part of Romania. After the Second Vienna Award, a little part of the former county became part of Hungary again and was assigned to the recreated Maros-Torda County. Its territory lies in the present Romanian counties Mureș (a.o. Târnăveni), Alba (the south-west) and Sibiu (the south, a.o. Dumbrăveni).

Demographics

Subdivisions

In the early 20th century, the subdivisions of Kis-Küküllő county were:

Notes

References 

Kingdom of Hungary counties in Transylvania